Cheerleader Nation is a reality television series based on the Paul Laurence Dunbar High School cheerleading team's ups and downs on the way to Nationals, of which they are the three-time champions. The show also explains how cheerleading is an intense physical activity. It takes place in Lexington, Kentucky. The team is on a quest to win a third National Championship. It was broadcast on the channel Lifetime.

Description 
Cheerleader Nation focuses on several varsity cheerleaders, including Ryan, Amanda, Megan, Katie, Ayrica, Kaitlin, Chelsea, Nicole and Ashley. The relationship with their mothers is also integral to the show.

The team's coach is Donna Martin, mother of team member Ryan. Another central character is Saleem who helps with the team's choreography along with Martin.

Cheerleaders 
Ryan  The coach's daughter   A sophomore who is also the coach's daughter. (She is now cheerleading coach at the University of Kentucky).
Amanda  The freshman  The only freshman on the varsity squad. Her birthday is June 18. She has a very close relationship with her mother, who is very involved in Amanda's life in high school, especially cheerleading. (She now cheers at the University of Tennessee, Knoxville).
Megan  The big sister  A senior who is nervous about graduating because she does not want to leave the familiarity of high school. Her birthday is April 13. Megan's season revolves around her ability to land a full layout in competition. She finally does so in Nationals.
Alexa  The little sister Megan's younger sister, is a sophomore who is also on the squad. Her birthday is September 24.
Kaitlin  The Captain
Katie  The new girl  A senior who has never cheered before.
Chelsea  The princess  A junior who does not get along with her mother very well and is best friends with fellow cheerleader, Nicole, although their relationship has started to suffer as a result of Nicole's serious boyfriend. Chelsea falls in the Regionals routine.
Ayrica  A junior who is one of the most consistent on the squad. She maintains a 4.2 GPA
Ashley  The perfectionist A junior who is very self-conscious but has a very supportive boyfriend, Brennan.

The show follows the girls from tryouts to Regionals and then to Nationals, where they win their third National Championship title.

Episode guide season 1
 Tryouts Fears and Tears
 Save the Drama for Your Mama
 Pressure Makes Perfect
 Regionals Roulette
 Generations Gap
 Nightline Before Nationals
 Team without a Dream (1)
 Team with a Dream (2)

See also 
Official Site
Cheerleading

External links 
 

Lifetime (TV network) original programming
Television shows set in Kentucky
Cheerleading television series
2000s American high school television series
2000s American reality television series
2006 American television series debuts
2006 American television series endings
Lexington, Kentucky
Television series about teenagers
Television series by 20th Century Fox Television